İbrahim khan (died 1479) was the Khan of Kazan from 1467. He was the son of Mäxmüd. He was crowned after Xälil's death and was married to Nursoltan. In 1467–1469 and 1478 he participated in wars against Muscovy. After concluding a treaty with Ivan III, all Russian prisoners of war held by the Khanate were released. He supported a policy of non-intervention into Muscovy's politics.

Wars against Muscovy 
In 1467 Ivan III began to wage war against the Kazan Khanate. In the fall he sent as a pretender oglan Kasim, Ibrahim's uncle, which was supported by a part of Kazan nobility. Ibrahim destroyed numerous Muscovite forces in the battle on the Idel(Volga).

At the head of opposition was mirza Gabgul-Mumin. The Russian campaign ended unsuccessfully, with the Russian army deciding to not cross the Volga to engage in combat with the Tatars. In response to this Ibrahim-khan in winter made a dragoon to the border areas of the enemy and plundered environs of Galich Merskoy.

In 1468 Ivan III sent strong garrisons to Nizhniy Novgorod, Murom, Kostroma, Galich and began military action on the territory of Khanate. This campaign accompanied by extreme violence against ordinary people with the purpose of provoking Kazan into a big war.

Ibrahim sent its armies by two directions: Galich and Nizhniy Novgorod-Muromsk. On the first way, the Khanate's army was contributed by success. Tatars captured the Kichmeng town and two volosts of Kostroma were been occupied. On the second way Russians stopped Tatars defeating Khadzhi-Berdy's troop.

Muscovy opened a third front from Khlynov. Ushkuyniks went by boats to Kama from Vyatka and began robbing the hinterland of the Khanate (deep behind the lines). In response to this Tatars sent troops that captured the capital of Vyatka Land - Khlynov.

References

Bibliography 

1479 deaths
Khanate of Kazan
15th-century monarchs in Europe
Year of birth unknown